Ileostylus is a genus of mistletoes in the family Loranthaceae. One member of the genus is only found in New Zealand.

Species list
Ileostylus kirkii (Oliv.) Tiegh.
Ileostylus micranthus Tiegh.

References

Loranthaceae
Loranthaceae genera